Let Loose is the debut album by British band Let Loose, released on 7 November 1994. It is the first studio album to be recorded by the original line-up of the band, and features their biggest hit, "Crazy for You". The album also spawned the singles "Seventeen", "One Night Stand", "Best in Me" and "The Way I Wanna Be". The album was also released as a limited edition picture disc vinyl in the United Kingdom.

Background
The band initially scored minor success in the UK Singles Chart with two of their first three singles; "Crazy for You" ( 44) and "Seventeen" (No. 44). They also released "Face to Face", which was later withdrawn from sale by their record label. "Crazy for You" was re-released in the UK, entering the UK Singles Chart at No. 24 and climbing to finally reach a No. 2 peak, selling over 400,000 copies in the process. The success of "Crazy for You" led to a remix of "Seventeen"; the track was unable to match the popularity of "Crazy for You" and peaked at No. 11. Their debut album entitled Let Loose, featuring keyboard player Adam Lee, was released and peaked at No. 20, selling 60,000 copies. The album release was followed by the single "One Night Stand", which peaked at No. 12. The final track to be taken from the album was the ballad "Best in Me" which, according to the album sleeve, was recorded in lead singer's Wermerling's bedroom at the age of fifteen. The track became their second UK top 10 hit, peaking at No. 8. The outfit then embarked on a UK tour.

Track listing

Charts

References

1994 debut albums
Let Loose albums
Mercury Records albums